Level of service may refer to:

 Levels of service in asset management
 Level of service (transportation) in transportation and traffic
 Something agreed on in a Service-level agreement (SLA)